St. Augustine's Catholic College is an independent Catholic secondary school in the town of Trowbridge, Wiltshire, England. The school has a sixth form for years 12 and 13.

The school opened on its site in the western suburbs of Trowbridge in 1967.  Previously a voluntary aided school, it has been an academy since September 2011.

When inspected by Ofsted in November 2021, the school was assessed as 'requires improvement' in all categories. This was its first inspection after conversion to an academy, since the academy inherited an 'outstanding' rating from its predecessor and was therefore exempt from inspection for a while. The 2021 report stated that pupils feel safe, attend punctually and behave well in lessons, however the curriculum is not planned or taught well enough for students to achieve as well as they should.

Notable alumni include the actors Will Thorp and Sam Otto, and the world champion athlete Danny Talbot.

References

External links

Ofsted reports

Trowbridge
Academies in Wiltshire
Catholic secondary schools in the Diocese of Clifton
Educational institutions established in 1955
1955 establishments in England
Secondary schools in Wiltshire